Michael Lynn Hoffman (born November 30, 1956) is an American film director.

Early life and education
Hoffman was born in Hawaii: the son of Dorothy (Harper) and Glenn R. Hoffman, who was stationed in the navy in Hawaii at the time. He grew up in Payette, Idaho, played basketball, and attended college at Boise State University. There he was elected as student body president of BSU. He was a cofounder of the Idaho Shakespeare Festival (along with Doug Copsey and Victoria Holloway) which is celebrating its 30-year anniversary this year. While at BSU, he served as president of the student body and earned the high honor of Rhodes Scholar in 1979, the first BSU alumnus to achieve this honor. While studying Renaissance literature at Oriel College, Oxford, he extended his interest in drama by founding the Oxford University Film Foundation and by making a student film Privileged, which starred a young Hugh Grant.

Career
Befriended by John Schlesinger, who provided the funding, Michael's next film was Restless Natives, a humorous look at young Scottish boys who hold up tour buses.  His other credits include Some Girls, a film starring the young Patrick Dempsey, Restoration with Robert Downey, Jr., One Fine Day with Michelle Pfeiffer and George Clooney, Soapdish with Sally Field and Kevin Kline, A Midsummer Night's Dream, for which he also wrote the screenplay based on the work by Shakespeare, and The Emperor's Club (starring Kevin Kline). He has made three films with Kline (so far), including the aforementioned A Midsummer Night's Dream.

His film Promised Land (1987) was nominated for the Grand Jury Prize at the Sundance Film Festival. Restoration (1995) was entered into the 46th Berlin International Film Festival.

He wrote and directed The Last Station (2009), based on the final years of Leo Tolstoy's life. It starred Christopher Plummer, Helen Mirren, James McAvoy, and Paul Giamatti.

Hoffman also directed Gambit (2012) and The Best of Me (2014). In addition, Hoffman also directed and co-wrote a movie for Netflix, a biopic about author Gore Vidal simply called Gore. The film was based on the biography Empire of Self: A Life of Gore Vidal by Jay Parini (who was also the film's other co-writer) and starred Kevin Spacey as Vidal. The movie was filmed in 2017 and was due for release for 2018 but this release was canceled in November 2017 after scandal broke out when Spacey's sexual misconduct was revealed in late October. Several other projects involving Spacey at the time were also cancelled or had him replaced over his misconduct.

Filmography

Executive producer
 The Great New Wonderful (2005)
 12 and Holding (2005)
 The Narrows (2008)

Awards

References

External links
 

1956 births
Living people
Alumni of Oriel College, Oxford
Film directors from Hawaii
People from Payette, Idaho
Boise State University alumni
American Rhodes Scholars
Film directors from Idaho